The Lancashire and Cheshire Antiquarian Society is a historical society and registered charity founded, on 21 March 1883, for the study of any aspects of the area covered by the Palatine Counties of Lancashire and Cheshire (and succeeding local authorities) from antiquity to the twenty-first century.

History
It was at a meeting convened in response to a circular issued by George Charles Yates (held in the Rooms of the Manchester Literary and Philosophical Society, in George Street, Manchester), that several antiquaries and historians (including William Ernest Armytage Axon, James Croston, Alfred Darbyshire, Lt-Col. Henry Fishwick, Robert Langton, George Webster Napier, Thomas Glazebrook Rylands, Rev. Joseph Heaton Stanning, Henry Taylor, and William Thompson Watkin) proposed the creation of a society with the purpose of organising excursions to places of historical and archaeological interest in Lancashire and Cheshire. These individuals were elected to form the society's first officers and Council.

Honorary Membership (bestowed between 1883 and 1988) was awarded to various individuals who made a contribution to the society or to the life of the Counties Palatine, recipients included James, Earl of Crawford (1883), Charles Roach Smith (1885), Charles William Sutton (1888), Isabella Banks (1893), Sir Henry Hoyle Howorth (1903), Robert Dukinfield Darbishire (1903), Charles Roeder (1903), John Wilfrid Jackson (1918), and Sir Edward Holt, Bt (1943), amongst others.

Although the society is based upon Manchester, its studies and activities embrace the region. Its purpose is the education of the public by fostering and promoting the study of any aspects of the archaeology (traditional and industrial), history, social history, genealogy, architecture and the arts, trade and trades, the history of institutions and local government, customs, and traditions of the area covered by the Palatine Counties of Lancashire and Cheshire (and succeeding local authorities). The society became a registered charity in 2004.

Journal

The Transactions of the Lancashire and Cheshire Antiquarian Society is the society's peer-reviewed periodical which is published annually, and includes papers covering a wide variety of subjects relating to the two counties.

The journal was established in 1883, by the founding Editor Rev. J.H. Stanning, and has been published almost continuously (with only occasional exceptions). The 111th volume was published in 2019, and the current (15th) Editor is Dr Stephen F. Collins. The society also produces other publications on occasion.

Activities
The society organises a varied programme of lectures and events including visits to exhibitions, libraries, museums, galleries and places of historical, architectural and archaeological interest. The society's library (amassed since 1883) was donated to Manchester Central Library in 2019.

Membership
Membership is open to all individuals and societies who are interested in the various historical aspects of the two Counties Palatine.

Officers

Presidents

Vice-Presidents

Transactions Editors

Secretaries

Treasurers

See also
Chetham Society
Historic Society of Lancashire and Cheshire
Record Society of Lancashire and Cheshire
Lancashire Parish Register Society

External links

Notes and references

1883 establishments in England
Regional and local learned societies of the United Kingdom
Historical societies of the United Kingdom
Organizations established in 1883
Organisations based in Manchester
Charities based in Manchester
Charities based in Greater Manchester
Clubs and societies in Greater Manchester
Publications established in 1883
Annual journals
History journals